The Värmlands Fotbollförbund (Värmland Football Association) is one of the 24 district organisations of the Swedish Football Association. It administers lower tier football in the historical province of Värmland.

Background 

Värmlands Fotbollförbund, commonly referred to as Värmlands FF, is the governing body for football in the historical province of Värmland, which corresponds with Värmland County (plus Karlskoga and Degerfors in Örebro County). The Association was founded on 2 April 1918 and currently has 138 member clubs. Based in Karlstad, the Association's Chairman is Annelie Larsson.

Affiliated members 

The following clubs are affiliated to the Värmlands FF:

Alkvetterns IK
Arvika Fotboll Supporter Klubb
Bäckalunds IF
Bäckhammars SK
Bergsängs BK
Bjälveruds IK
Björneborgs IF
Blomskogs IF
Borgviks IF
Bortans IK
Bråtens IK
Bro AIK
Brunskogs SK
Carlstad FC
Carlstad United BK
Carlstad United Ungdom FF
Degerfors IF
Degerfors IF Ungdom
Deje IK
Eda IF
Edsvalla IF
Ekshärads BK
Eskilsäters IF
Fagerås BK
FBK Karlstad
FC Kristinehamn
Fensbols IF
Filipstads FF
Finnskoga FF
Fiskeviks IF
FK QBIK
Forshaga IF
Geijersfors AIF
Gettjärns IF
Gillberga FF
Granbergsdals IF
Gräsmark GoIF
Grums IK FK
Gunnarskog IK
Häljebodas IF
Hertzöga BK
Hillringsbergs IF
Högboda IF
Holmedals AIS
IF Brunskog United
IF Kil
IF Nyedshov-Lindfors
IF Örnen
IFK Ås
IFK Edebäck-Uddeholm
IFK Heden
IFK Kristinehamn
IFK Kronoparken
IFK Munkfors
IFK Ölme
IFK Skoghall
IFK Sunne Fotboll
IFK Väse
IFK Velen
IK Arvika Fotboll
IK Vikings FK
Immetorp BK
Innerstadens BK
IS Emtarna
Jössefors IK
Karlanda IF
Karlskoga SK
Karlstad BK Ungdom
Karlstads BK
KB Karlskoga FF
KFUM i Karlstad
Kila IF
Kils AIK FK
Kils BK
Klässbols SK
Köla AIK
Koppoms IK
Kronans DFK
Kronans FK
Kronoparkens FF
Kronoparkens Skol-IF
Långseruds IF
Lesjöfors IF
Lindfors IF
Lusaskens FC
Lysviks IF
Mallbackens IF
Mangskog SK
Nolgårds IK
Nor IK
Nordmarks IF
Nordvärmland FF
Norra Ny FF
Norrstrands IF
Norrstrands Veteraner FF
Nykroppa AIK
Olsäters SK
Orrholmens IF
Persbergs SK
QBIK
Råda IK
Rännbergs IK
Råtorps IK
Rävåsens IK
Rinns AIK
Rottneros IK
Säffle FF
Segmons IF
Silleruds IF
SK Klaran
SK Sifhälla
Skattkärrs IF
Skoghalls FF
Slottsbrons IF
Sommarro IF
Sörby IK
Storfors FF
Strömtorps IK
Sunnemo IF
Svanskogs IF
Töcksfors IF
Torsby IF
Uddeholms IF
Ulvsby IF
Värmlandsbro SK
Värmskogs SK
Varnans Vingar IF
Västanviks AIF
Villastadens IF
Vitsands IF
Woody's FC
Åmotfors IF
Årjängs IF
Åtorps IF
Älgå SK
Ämterviks FF
Ängebäck BK
Östra Deje IK

League Competitions 
Värmlands FF run the following League Competitions:

Men's Football
Division 4  -  one section
Division 5  -  two sections
Division 6  -  four sections
Division 7  -  six sections

Women's Football
Division 3  -  one section
Division 4  -  one section
Division 5  -  two sections

Footnotes

External links 
 Värmlands FF Official Website 

Varmlands
Football in Värmland County
Sports organizations established in 1918
1918 establishments in Sweden